Zohor is a village and municipality in western Slovakia in Malacky District in the Bratislava Region.

History
The village was first mentioned in 1314 as Sahur.

Famous people
Albín Brunovský, painter

References

External links

Municipal website

Villages and municipalities in Malacky District